The Ape is a 2005 American comedy film directed by James Franco in his directorial debut. Franco also starred in, wrote, and served as executive producer of the film.

Plot 
Human resources drone and put-upon family man Harry imagines he could be the next Dostoyevsky if he could just get a little peace and quiet.  When he moves out of his family home and into his own apartment to craft his masterpiece, his solitude is broken by an unexpected roommate, a foul-mouthed, Hawaiian shirt-wearing Gorilla.

The ape harasses Harry constantly, sharing his opinions on life, love and animal magnetism.  He inspires Harry to embrace his own most carnal and base impulses.  This leads to trouble at the office where Harry embarks on an ill-advised affair with his high-strung boss and makes questionable decisions during a big presentation. Back at their apartment, Harry and the ape grow closer, but it's not clear that their relationship is helping Harry's writing.  His short story is rejected by the New Yorker magazine, and Harry finds himself increasingly cut off from the world outside.  It all leads to a startling confrontation that is both dark and disturbing.

Cast
 James Franco as Harry Walker
 Brian Lally as The Ape
 Allison Bibicoff as Cathy
 Stacey Miller as Beth
 Vince Jolivette as Steve
 Nori Jill Phillips as Judy
 Danny Molina as Raoul
 David Markey as Flies With Eagles

Release 
The film was released in the United States on June 18, 2005.

Critical response
Variety called the film "self-indulgent."

See also 
 2005 in film

References

External links 
 
 

2005 films
American comedy films
Films directed by James Franco
2005 directorial debut films
2005 comedy films
2000s English-language films
2000s American films